Paul Wyatt (born 29 December 1989) is an English professional footballer who plays as a midfielder.

Paul has also played for Tiverton Town.

Career
Wyatt played four years of college soccer at James Madison University between 2009 and 2012. He also played for USL PDL club Reading United AC in 2012.

Wyatt signed for USL Pro club Oklahoma City Energy on 14 February 2014.

References

1989 births
Living people
English footballers
English expatriate footballers
James Madison Dukes men's soccer players
Reading United A.C. players
OKC Energy FC players
Association football midfielders
USL League Two players
USL Championship players
English expatriate sportspeople in the United States
Expatriate soccer players in the United States